Reddingen is a village in the municipality of Wietzendorf in Soltau-Fallingbostel district, Lower Saxony, Germany. The village, even with its associated hamlets of Reiningen and Halmern, only has 100 inhabitants. Formerly an independent municipality, it is part of Wietzendorf since 1974.

Location 
Reddingen lies on the Lüneburg Heath. The Wietze river flows through the settlement of Reiningen. The Munster South Training Area begins immediately north of the three villages and is closed to the public.

Transport 
The K 11 and K 38 district roads meet in the village. The VNN's bus line no. 352 runs through the villages.

By the Wietze in Reiningen is a water gauge and a hydrometric gauging station belonging to the NLWKN for gathering environmental data.

In Halmern, Reddingen and Reiningen there are no road names, just house numbers which the residents, postal staff, local suppliers and visitors have to get to know.

Politics 
The chair of the parish council (Ortsvorsteher) is Wilhelm Grünhagen.

Heidekreis
Villages in Lower Saxony